Sofie Kirk Kristiansen (born November 18, 1976) is a Danish fourth-generation owner of The Lego Group. Together with her father Kjeld, sister Agnete and brother Thomas, they split ownership of a 75% stake in the company.

Sofie Kirk Kristiansen holds a B.A. degree from the department of ethnography at the Aarhus University. She is the daughter of former Lego CEOs Kjeld Kirk Kristiansen, granddaughter of Godtfred Kirk Christiansen, and great-granddaughter of the company founder Ole Kirk Christiansen. As of 2022, the family is considered to be the richest family in Denmark, with an estimated $32.8 billion of Denmark’s $57 billion total billionaire wealth.

Sofie Kristiansen owns a large hunting lodge between Holsted and Hovborg in South Jutland. She is also a close friend of Crown Princess Mary and Crown Prince Frederik. Sofie Kristiansen was married to Christopher Kiær Thomsen, but the couple divorced in 2014.

Sofie Kristiansen made the 2022 Forbes Billionaires List with an estimated wealth of $8.2 billion and occupied the 267th position.

References 

1976 births
Living people
Danish businesspeople
Danish billionaires
20th-century Danish businesspeople
21st-century Danish businesspeople